Kothandaramapuram   is a village in the Annavasalrevenue block of Pudukkottai district, Tamil Nadu, India.

Demographics 

As per the 2001 census, Kothandaramapuram  had a total population of 1429 with 716 males and 713 females. Out of the total population 708    people were literate.

References

Villages in Pudukkottai district